Bhimeshwar  is a village development committee in Sindhuli District in the Janakpur Zone of south-eastern Nepal. At the time of the 1991 Nepal census, it had a population of 1,855 people living in 326 individual households.

Education
Bhim Public High School

References

External links
UN map of the municipalities of Sindhuli District

Populated places in Sindhuli District